is a 2009 Japanese comedy film. It stars comedian Naoto Takenaka as "the General", the dictator of a fictional Asian country, which parodies the North Korean leader Kim Jong-il. The film also parodies the 2009 Japanese disaster film Pandemic.

Plot
A mysterious virus with the 100% mortality rate spreads across Japan. Everyone infected with this virus dies without exception, screaming and their heads exploding. After the explosion, their faces turn into a smiling face which strongly resembles Kim Jong-il.

Notes and references

External links

2009 films
Japanese comedy films
2000s parody films
2009 comedy films
2000s Japanese films